Ken Nagayoshi (永吉 拳, Nagayoshi Ken, born 26 October 1999) is a Japanese field hockey player for the Tenri University Bears and the Japanese national team.

He represented Japan at the 2020 Summer Olympics.

References

External links
Tokyo 2020 profile

1999 births
Living people
Field hockey players at the 2020 Summer Olympics
Japanese male field hockey players
Male field hockey midfielders
Olympic field hockey players of Japan
Sportspeople from Tochigi Prefecture
2023 Men's FIH Hockey World Cup players
21st-century Japanese people